SparkOptimus is a management consulting firm with a focus on digital strategy and digital transformation with offices in Amsterdam, Dusseldorf and Zurich.

History
 
SparkOptimus was founded in 2010 by Alexandra Jankovich and Tom Voskes, two former McKinsey & Company employees.

In 2014, SparkOptimus was listed in the Top 5 of best Strategy Consultants of the Netherlands. SparkOptimus has been named the number 1 digital strategy consultancy of the Netherlands by Emerce five times, most recently in 2022. In 2017, the NextWomenTop100, published by Elsevier (magazine), listed SparkOptimus co-founder Alexandra Jankovich as one of the 100 most successful female entrepreneurs in the Netherlands.

The firm published their first book, Make Disruption Work in 2018, which became a business bestseller in the Netherlands. In 2020, managing partner Tom Voskes was a co-author of the MITSloan book 7 Key Principles to Govern Digital Initiatives. In 2022, Jankovich and Voskes co-authored the book Disruption in Action with Adrian Hornsby. which argues that transformation is 80% people and only 20% tech, and that the goal is always to make things better for customers.

In response to the refugee crisis after the 2022 Russian invasion of Ukraine, the firm helped develop the Refugee Help initiative.

References

External links 
 SparkOptimus company website
 Make Disruption Work (book)
 Disruption in Action (book)

Dutch companies established in 2010
Management consulting firms of the Netherlands
International management consulting firms